Donald Paige Frary (1893-1919) was a noted American professor and writer.  

Frary was born in Charlemont, Massachusetts on August 9, 1893 to Edward Sanderson and Caroline Louisa (née Paige) Frary.  Frary was a graduate of Yale University and would serve as a professor there, specializing in International Affairs.  During his tenure at Yale Frary completed two books that established him as one of the pre-eminent scholars on the subject of Eastern Europe.  His third book, "How the World Votes,"  co-authored with fellow Yale professor Charles Seymour, garnered considerably more critical praise, so much so that nearly a century later it is still considered one of the best books on the electoral process.

Frary's expertise on the subject of Eastern Europe caught the attention of the Wilson Administration and he was asked to serve as a secretary to Colonel Edward M. House, President Woodrow Wilson's closest advisor, on the American Commission to Negotiate Peace following the end of World War I.  Frary travelled with the American delegation to negotiate peace at the Paris Peace Conference, 1919.  While attending the Peace Conference Frary fell ill with pneumonia caused by the spanish flu and died in Paris on April 8, 1919.

Books Authored by Donald Paige Frary
Elections and Democracy in Russia, 1917
Magyars and Jugoslavs, 1918
How the World Votes: The Story of Democratic Development in Elections, 1918 (co-authored with Charles Seymour)

Primary Sources
The Frary Family in America: 1637–1980, by Margaret Murphy and Anne Frary Lepak, The Frary Family Association, 1980.
The Frary Family in America: A Continuation, by Anne Frary Lepak, The Frary Family Association, 1985.

1893 births
1919 deaths
Deaths from Spanish flu
People from Charlemont, Massachusetts
Yale University alumni
Yale University faculty
Infectious disease deaths in France
Deaths from pneumonia in France